Al Johnson's Swedish Restaurant is a family owned, casual dining restaurant in Sister Bay, Wisconsin; it is known for its Swedish cuisine and Scandinavian experience, as well as for its goats which graze on the rooftop on summer days, to the delight of guests.

History
In 1949, Al Johnson, the owner, opened a restaurant that he called Al's Home Cooking, which is now called Al Johnson's Swedish Restaurant & Butik. In 1973, Al Johnson renovated the restaurant by importing wooden logs from a building in Norway and added a sod roof. Al's wife, Ingert, redid the interior to accommodate a more traditional Scandinavian design. Ingert also added a gift shop called Al’s Butik as a time consuming activity for restaurant patrons waiting to be seated. After the renovation was complete, a friend nicknamed Wink Larson gave Johnson a goat named Oscar as a joke, Wink decided to put Oscar on the roof as a joke. He later caught the attention of pedestrians, and inspired Al to obtain additional goats and put them on the roof as a marketing gimmick. In 1996, the Johnsons registered the "Goats on the Roof" trademark, so that other competing restaurants in the United States are prohibited to having goats on their roofs. As of late 2020 Al Johnson’s opened a Scandinavian-inspired Butik next to their thrill-seeking Beer garden. The shop includes many items with rich Scandinavian history.

Location
Al Johnson's is on the main street (Hwy 42) in the town of Sister Bay, which is located in Door County, Wisconsin.

Goats and the Goat Cam
The restaurant has two cameras that overlook the roof, allowing people to watch the goats at any hour of the day from spring to October. The goats are removed from the roof at night and when weather reaches a high of 80 degrees. Once the goat’s work day is over they are taken to a farm just out of the city center of Sister Bay. The little farm is run by one of Al Johnson’s sons and his wife.

References

External links
Al Johnson's Swedish Restaurant and Butik
Hard driving restauranteur Al Johnson doesn't mince words by Norbert Blei, Door County Advocate, June 22, 1978

1949 establishments in Wisconsin
Restaurants established in 1949
Restaurants in Wisconsin
Swedish-American culture in Wisconsin
Goats
Swedish cuisine